The women's long jump event at the 2011 World Championships in Athletics was held at the Daegu Stadium on August 27 and 28.

Reigning world champion Brittney Reese was the pre-event favourite as she held the best mark that year (7.19 m) and led on the Diamond League circuit. Russia's Darya Klishina and Olga Zaytseva were the only ones to have cleared seven metres that season, while Americans Funmi Jimoh and Janay DeLoach were the only jumpers to have defeated Reese on the circuit. Veronika Shutkova and Maurren Maggi (the 2008 Olympic gold medallist) were other highly ranked entrants.

Maggi produced the best jump of the qualifying rounds, followed by Belarusian Nastassia Mironchyk-Ivanova. Brittney Reese needed the last of her three jumps to achieve the qualifying mark. Zaytseva was the most prominent jumper to be eliminated at the first stage. Maggi, Jimoh and Naide Gomes were high-profile eliminations in the first half of the final round. Reese took the lead with her first jump of 6.82 m and, despite having had five no-jumps, she remained in first place to take the gold. It was Olga Kucherenko, Ineta Radēviča and Nastassia Mironchyk-Ivanova who fought for the minor medals. Mironchyk-Ivanova jumped 6.74 m in round three, only to be overtaken by Kucherenko (6.77 m) the following round. Radēviča produced her best (6.76 m) with her final jump to edge into the bronze medal position.

Reese's mark of 6.82 m was the shortest winning distance in the history of the event at the World Championships. Nevertheless, she became only the second woman to ever win two consecutive long jump world titles, matching the feat of her fellow American Jackie Joyner-Kersee. Kucherenko and Radēviča gained their first ever medals on the world stage, although both had been medallists at the 2010 European Athletics Championships.

Mironchyk-Ivanova was fourth. She had a jump which seemed to be the longest of all, about 6.90 m. Her ponytail swang and left the mark behind at 6.74 m and she lost the win and all the other medals as a result.

A retest of silver medallist Kucherenko's sample in 2016 came back positive for doping and she was stripped of her medal. As a result Radēviča was promoted to silver medal and Mironchyk-Ivanova moved into the medals with a bronze.

Medalists
Revised

Original

Records
Prior to the competition, the established records were as follows.

Qualification standards

Schedule

Results

Qualification
Qualification: Qualifying Performance 6.75 (Q) or at least 12 best performers (q) advance to the final.

Final
Format: Each athlete has three attempts, then the eight best performers have three further attempts

References

External links
 Long jump results at IAAF website

Long jump
Long jump at the World Athletics Championships
2011 in women's athletics